In algebra, an irreducible element of a integral domain is a non-zero element that is not invertible (that is, is not a unit), and is not the product of two non-invertible elements.

The irreducible elements are the terminal elements of a factorization process; that is, they are the factors that cannot be further factorized. The irreducible factors of an element are uniquely defined, up to the multiplication by a unit, if the integral domain is a unique factorization domain. It has been discovered in the 19th century that the rings of integers of some number fields are not unique factorization domains, and, therefore, that some irreducible elements can appear in some factorization of an element and not in other factorizations of the same element. The ignorance of this fact is the main error in many of the wrong proofs of Fermat's Last Theorem that have been given during the three centuries between Fermat's statement and Wiles's proof of Fermat's Last Theorem.

The definition can be and is usually extended verbatim to the elements of an arbitrary commutative ring.

This equivalence does not hold for general commutative rings, which is why the assumption of the ring having no zero divisors is commonly made in the definition of irreducible elements.

Relationship with prime elements
Irreducible elements should not be confused with prime elements. The converse is true for unique factorization domains (or, more generally, GCD domains).

Moreover, while an ideal generated by a prime element is a prime ideal, it is not true in general that an ideal generated by an irreducible element is an irreducible ideal.

Example 
In the quadratic integer ring  it can be shown using norm arguments that the number 3 is irreducible. However, it is not a prime element in this ring since, for example, 

but 3 does not divide either of the two factors.

See also
 Irreducible polynomial

References 

 

Ring theory
Algebraic properties of elements